Tim Braun may refer to:

Timmy Braun, a former member of band Texas Hippie Coalition
Tim Braun, television producer and son of Craig Braun